Sheshan Island is located  east of Chongming Island, in the estuary of the Yangtze River.

The island is under the jurisdiction of the Shanghai Municipal Region and is guarded by the People's Liberation Army Navy. A 130-year-old lighthouse is located on the island. On November 1, 2005, the stele of "Chinese territorial sea baseline point" was erected.

See also
Waikejiao (外磕脚)
Haijiao (海礁)
 List of islands in the East China Sea

Notes and references

External links
 Declaration of the Government of the People's Republic of China on the baselines of the territorial sea(May15th, 1996)
中国东海１０座领海基点石碑建成
中华人民共和国政府关于中华人民共和国领海基线的声明(1996年5月15日)

Islands of Shanghai
Baselines of the Chinese territorial sea
Islands of the East China Sea